The 1925 Detroit Titans football team represented the University of Detroit as an independent during the 1925 college football season. In their first season under head coach Gus Dorais, the Titans compiled a  5–4 record and were outscored by opponents by a combined total of 81 to 70. William K. Brett was the team captain.

Schedule

References

External links
 1925 University of Detroit football programs

Detroit
Detroit Titans football seasons
Detroit Titans football
Detroit Titans football